Jean Louis (1970–1990) is a Haitian artist.

Jean Louis lives in Pétion-Ville, as a young painter he studied under Laurent Casimir which influence can be seen in many of his paintings. After the earthquake in 2010 he lost his home and has since been selling his paintings on the street in Port-au-Prince.

Recently the paintings has also been sold online through ArtSumo.

References

20th-century births
1990 deaths
Haitian artists